Kinnerasani is an important tributary of Godavari flowing through the Warangal and Bhadradri districts of Telangana and Eluru district of Andhra Pradesh.

In the Khammam District, a dam known as the Kinnerasani Dam is built on this river. The back waters of the dam are surrounded by verdant hills and come to be protected under the precincts of the Kinnerasani Wildlife Sanctuary.
The river drains on the right bank of Godavari in Telangana and forms common boundary between Andhra Pradesh and Telangana states before its confluence with main Godavari river.

References 

Tributaries of the Godavari River
Rivers of Telangana
Rivers of Andhra Pradesh
Geography of West Godavari district
Rivers of India